Mitchel P Goldman (born April 5, 1955), is an American dermatologic surgeon, cosmetic surgeon, dermatologist, and phlebologist, and a past president of the American Society for Dermatologic Surgery and the American College of Phlebology.

Biography

Education 
Goldman earned his bachelor's degree at Boston University, and his medical degree at Stanford University School of Medicine. This was followed by an internal medicine internship at the University of California, San Diego, and a dermatology residency at the University of California, Los Angeles. Goldman is board certified by both the American Board of Dermatology and the American Board of Cosmetic Surgery.

Career
Goldman is the founder and medical director of the Cosmetic Laser Dermatology Center and an adjunct clinical professor in dermatology at the medical center of the University of California in San Diego. He is a part president of the American Society for Dermatologic Surgery, the founder and past president of the American College of Phlebology and a founding member of the Space Dermatology Foundation. He is the Director of the American Society for Dermatologic Surgery Fellowship Program (which he conceived in 2013) and has hospital affiliations with Scripps Memorial Hospital in La Jolla, California.

He is an associate editor of several medical journals including: Dermatologic Surgery, Journal of Cosmetic Dermatology, Cosmetic Surgery and Venous Digest.

Goldman is a fellow of the American Academy of Dermatology, American Society for Dermatologic Surgery, American Board of Cosmetic Surgery, American Society for Laser Medicine and Surgery, American Academy of Cosmetic Surgery, and American College of Phlebology.

Goldman also specializes in the field of veins and sclerotherapy vein treatments, having written and lectured extensively on these and related vascular topics, publishing multiple medical textbooks on the subject in 5 languages, some now in their 6th edition.

Publications

Textbooks
 Sclerotherapy Treatment of Varicose and Telangiectatic Leg Veins: Sixth Edition, Elsevier (2017). ; 4th ed., (2007). 
 Cellulite: Pathophysiology and Treatment, 2nd Edition New York (2010). 
 Photodynamic Therapy, Second Edition, Saunders, Elsevier (2008). 
 Cutaneous and Cosmetic Laser Surgery, Mosby/Elsevier (2006).

Most cited articles

References

External links
 

1955 births
American dermatologists
Living people
Stanford University alumni